Enric Auquer Sardà (born 10 March 1988) is a Spanish actor.

Career
Auquer's interest in acting began in 2008 after his mother encouraged him to enroll in a drama school in Barcelona. Drama classes helped him with his ADHD, as he stated: "It was the first time I felt I could be good at something. Acting healed me a lot".

He got his first acting role in 2009 when he starred in the film Dieta mediterránea. After that, he began performing in theaters and, in 2017, he was cast in the television series Com si fos ahir, gaining popularity in Catalonia.

In 2019, he got his major role to date as a young Galician drug dealer in the film Eye for an Eye. For the role, he was awarded Best New Actor at the 34th Goya Awards., Best Supporting Actor in a Film at the VII Premios Feroz and Best Actor in a Supporting Role at the 12th Gaudí Awards. In television, he got a leading role in the series Vida perfecta in which he played a young man with intellectual disability that becomes a father. He also won Best Main Actor in a TV Series at the VIII Premios Feroz for the role.

Filmography

Stage
 In Memoriam
 Nit de Reis
 Natale in casa Cupiello
 Sacrificios de Iban Valero
 Titus Andrònic
 Pervertimento
 Tonio, el poeta
 Teatro sin animales
 Titus Andronicus

Awards and nominations

Gaudí Awards

Goya Awards

MiM Series Awards

Ondas Awards

Premios CEC

Premios Feroz

References

External links 
 

1988 births
21st-century Spanish male actors
Spanish male television actors
Living people
Spanish male film actors
Male actors from Catalonia